Elizabeth Ann Francis (born 1960), known as Lisa Francis, is a former member of the National Assembly for Wales for the Welsh Conservative Party in the Mid and West Wales region. The region covers the areas of Powys, Pembrokeshire, Ceredigion, Camarthenshire and Gwynedd; Francis represented the region from 2003 to 2007.

In 2007 Francis also served on Aberystwyth's Town Council.  She was also Deputy Chair of Mid & West Wales Area Conservative Council, and the Welsh Conservative Spokesman for Welsh Language and Culture and for Older People's issues, but subsequently left the Conservatives.

In addition to her political activities, Francis is a Director of the Mid Wales Tourism Company and is the Trade Representative for Ceredigion. She also serves on Ceredigion Hospital's Working Committee and on the Aberystwyth Citizens Advice Bureau – Management Board.

In 2007 Francis won the Dods Assembly Woman of the Year Award .

External links
Lisa Francis My View – blog
Lisa Francis Page on Welsh Conservatives Website
Welsh Conservatives Website

Offices held

1960 births
Living people
Conservative Party members of the Senedd
Wales AMs 2003–2007
Female members of the Senedd